Rusty Glover (born April 17, 1966) is an American politician and former teacher who served in the Alabama Senate, representing the 34th district from 2006 to 2018. Previously, he was a member of the Alabama House of Representatives, representing the 102nd district from 2002 to 2006. He unsuccessfully ran as a Republican candidate for Lieutenant Governor of Alabama in the 2018 election cycle, as well as for State Auditor of Alabama in 2022.

Early life and career
Glover was born in Mobile, Alabama, on April 17, 1966. He attended B.C. Rain High School in Mobile. After graduation, he studied at Faulkner State Community College, where he earned an associate's degree. He then attended the University of South Alabama, where he attained a BSc. in secondary education, an M.A. in history, and a M.Ed. in secondary education.

Glover taught history at Mary G. Montgomery High School in Semmes, Alabama, for 25 years, in addition to coaching baseball and football there.

Political career
Glover was elected to the Alabama House of Representatives in 2002 and served one term, representing the 102nd district. Glover ran a brief campaign for Alabama's 1st congressional district that year, in a Republican primary eventually won by Jo Bonner, before being elected to the Alabama House of Representatives instead.

Glover was first elected to the Alabama State Senate in 2006, and served three terms, representing the 34th district. The Montgomery Advertiser wrote that he "rarely faced serious opposition in his campaigns." He took on the leadership role of Majority Whip by 2016.

While serving in the state legislature, Glover supported the end of Common Core in schools, and sponsored legislation enacting higher penalties for those found guilty of driving under the influence, which later became law. In 2017, Glover proposed an appointment system for vacancies in the Alabama state government, thereby reducing the number of special elections. It passed in a 2018 amendment vote with 60% support.

In February 2017, Glover announced that he would be running for Lieutenant Governor of Alabama in 2018; he was the first candidate to launch a campaign for that position. Glover was one of three candidates in the race, and finished in third, missing the runoff with 19.6% of the vote.

Glover ran for State Auditor of Alabama in the 2022 election cycle, announcing his campaign in July 2021. Glover finished in third place out of three candidates, missing the runoff with 27.7% of the vote.

Personal life
Glover lives in Semmes, Alabama, with his wife, Connie. The couple have two daughters. Glover attends the Wilmer Baptist Church in Wilmer, Alabama. He is also a member of The Gideons International and the National Rifle Association.

References

External links
 Alabama State Legislature – Senator Rusty Glover (official government website, archived)

Living people
1966 births
Politicians from Mobile, Alabama
University of South Alabama alumni
Southern Baptists
Republican Party Alabama state senators
Republican Party members of the Alabama House of Representatives
21st-century American politicians
People from Semmes, Alabama
Baptists from Alabama